Nicetas was born in Kiev, Kievan Rus', he became a monk in the Monastery of the Caves, but then embraced the life of a hermit. According to custom, Nicetas was much plagued by demonic torments and returned to the monastery. Later in 1095 Nicetas was named to the office of Bishop of Novgorod, he acquired a reputation for performing miracles.

His feast days in the Orthodox Church are on 14 May;  the day of his repose, 31 January; and the day of the Uncovering of his Relics in 1558, on 30 April.
The relics of Nicetas are in Cathedral of St. Sophia, Novgorod.

Notes

12th-century Christian saints
1107 deaths
Russian Benedictines
12th-century Eastern Orthodox bishops
Russian saints
Ukrainian saints
Year of birth unknown